Burgi may refer to:

People
Chuck Burgi (born 1952), American drummer
Irene Bürgi, Swiss curler
Jost Bürgi (1552–1632), Swiss clockmaker, mathematician and maker of astronomical instruments
Paolo Bürgi (born 1947), Swiss landscape architect
Richard Burgi (born 1958), American actor

Other uses
2481 Bürgi, an asteroid
Burgui – Burgi, a Spanish town
Ness of Burgi, Shetland
Ness of Burgi fort
Burgi, plural of burgus, a type of Roman fortified watchtower

See also
Bürgi–Dunitz angle
Burgie (1924–2019), American musician
Burgis (disambiguation)
Burji (disambiguation)